The Birkin bag (or simply Birkin) is a kind of tote bag introduced in 1984 by the French luxury goods maker Hermès. Birkin bags are handmade from leather and are named after the English-French actress and singer Jane Birkin. 

The bag quickly became a symbol of wealth and exclusivity due to its high price and assumed long waiting lists. Birkins are a popular item with handbag collectors, and were once seen as the rarest handbag in the world. The bag's value is a matter of its intentionally high price, which has led to its being described as a Veblen good.

In 2020, prices started at US$11,000 for regular leather. The price has reached US$380,000 (HK$2.94 million) when a bag made of exotic skin and diamond was sold at auction by Christie's in Hong Kong for a record price in May 2017. Costs can vary widely according to the type of leather, if exotic skins are used, and if precious metals and jewels are part of the bag. Birkins are distributed to Hermès boutiques on unpredictable schedules and in limited quantities, which creates artificial scarcity and exclusivity; however, the bags have also flooded the upscale resale market and are frequently sold in second-hand boutiques (resellers) and through social media.

History

In 1984, Hermès chief executive Jean-Louis Dumas was seated next to Jane Birkin on a flight from Paris to London. Birkin had just placed her straw traveling bag in the overhead compartment for her seat, but the contents fell to the deck, leaving her to scramble to replace them. Birkin explained to Dumas that it had been difficult to find a leather weekend bag she liked.

Dumas took this encounter as inspiration to create a supple black leather bag, based on an earlier design, the Haut à Courroies, which Hermès had created around 1900. Birkin initially used the bag, but changed her mind because she was carrying too many things in it: "What's the use of having a second one?" she said laughingly. "You only need one and that busts your arm; they're bloody heavy. I'm going to have to have an operation for tendonitis in the shoulder." Nevertheless, since the late 1980s, the bag has become a status symbol, though it has become much easier to purchase due to aftermarket resales.

In July 2015, Birkin asked Hermès to stop using her name for the crocodile version due to ethical concerns, as PETA alleged crocodile farms supplying the hide to Hermès for the manufacture of the bags crammed their animals into barren concrete pits. PETA reported that: "At just one year old, alligators are shot with a captive bolt gun or crudely cut into while they're still conscious and able to feel pain." Birkin is quoted as having asked Hermès "to debaptise the Birkin Croco until better practices in line with international norms can be put in place".

Design

Birkin bags are sold in a range of sizes. Each one may be made to order with different customer-chosen hides, colour, and hardware fixtures. There are also other individual options, such as diamond encrusting.

 The bag also comes in a variety of hides such as calf leather, lizard, and ostrich. Among the most expensive used to be saltwater crocodile skin and bags with smaller scales cost more than those with larger scales. Each bag is lined with goat-skin, the colour of the interior matching the exterior. Prices for the Birkin bag depend on type of skin, the colour, and hardware fixtures.
 Sizes range from 25-, 30-, 35-, to 40-centimetres, with travelling bags of 50- and 55-centimetres. It also comes in a variety of colours such as black, brown, golden tan, navy blue, olive green, orange, pink, powder blue, red, and white.
 The bag has a lock and keys. The keys are enclosed in a leather lanyard known as a clochette, carried by looping it through a handle. The bag is locked by closing the top flaps over buckle loops, wrapping the buckle straps, or closing the lock on the front hardware. Locks and keys are number-coded. Early locks only bore one number on the bottom of the lock. In more recent years, Hermès has added a second number under the Hermès stamp of the lock. The numbers for locks may be the same for hundreds of locks, as they are batch numbers in which the locks were made.
 The metallic hardware (the lock, keys, buckle hardware, and base studs) are plated with gold or palladium. Detailing with diamonds is another custom option.
 Hermès offers a "spa treatment," which is a reconditioning treatment for heavily-used bags.
 A "Shooting Star" Birkin has a metallic image resembling a shooting star, stamped adjacent to the "Hermès, Paris Made in France" stamp, that is in gold or silver to match the hardware and embossing. Rarely, the stamp is blind or colourless, if the bag is made of one or two leathers onto which no metallic stamping is used. Sometimes, Birkins or other Hermès bags may be made by independent artisans for "personal use", but only once a year. Every bag bears the stamp of the artisan who made the bag. These identifications vary widely, but are not different for every bag made. Finding stamps of more than one artisan on a bag occurs because the stamp is not a serial reference. Fonts and the order of stamping may vary, depending on the artisans.
The Birkin bag may be distinguished from the similar Hermès Kelly bag by the number of its handles. The single-handle handbag is the Kelly, but the Birkin has two handles.

Craftsmanship
The bags are handmade in France using the company's signature saddle stitching, developed in the 1800s. Each bag is hand-sewn by a single artisan, and is then buffed, painted, and polished, taking up to 18 hours to make.  Artisans purportedly train for 5 years before they're allowed to make their first Birkin bag. Leathers are obtained from different tanners in France, resulting in varying smells and textures. The company justifies the cost of the Birkin bag compared to other bags because of the degree of craftsmanship involved.

Demand
According to a 2014 estimate, Hermès produced 70,000 Birkin bags that year. The bag is highly coveted and has been reputed to have a waiting list of up to six years. The rarity of these bags is purportedly designed to increase demand by collectors.

As a result of strong demand, the Birkin bag has a high resale value in many countries, especially in Asia, and to such an extent that the bag is considered by some people as an instrument of investment. One 2016 study found that Birkin bags had average annual returns of 14.2% between 1980 and 2015, significantly beating the S&P 500 Index in returns over the same period. In April 2010, Hermès announced that the waiting list would no longer exist, implying that these bags are potentially available to the general public. 

The Philippine Star reported in March 2013, that a high-end, 30-cm Shiny Rouge H Porosus Crocodile Birkin with 18-carat gold fittings and encrusted with diamonds was sold for US$203,150 at an auction in Dallas, Texas, US.

In May 2017, a 30-centimeter matte white Himalaya niloticus crocodile Birkin with 18-carat white gold and hardware bearing 245 diamonds was sold at a Christie's auction in Hong Kong for HK$2.94 million (US$377,261), creating a new record for the most expensive handbag in the world.

According to an analyst quoted by The New York Times in 2019, there are more than one million Birkin bags on the market, while a resale boutique in Miami has sold more than US$60 million in used Birkin bags in just five years.

The limited availability of the bags is in part due to the unclear sales strategy in boutiques; there is a low likelihood that a given Hermès boutique will facilitate sale to any prospecting customer, as popular rumour suggests that one must have a long-standing relationship with one of the Hermès sales associates in order to successfully acquire a Birkin, and waiting lists for them no longer exist.

Counterfeits
In addition to the possible counterfeits that all well-known brands are subject to, fake Hermès bags—including the Birkin bag—are alleged to have been made by a group including seven former Hermès workers. Ten people went on trial in June 2020, alleged to have made dozens of counterfeit bags that sold for tens of thousands of euros each, for a total profit of over €2 million. The crime was discovered by police investigating unrelated stolen products. Four of those on trial were skilled leatherworkers; the bags were made using Hermès stitching methods. The counterfeiters imported crocodile skins. Leather offcuts, tools, zips, and faulty bags that were to be destroyed had been stolen from Hermès.

In popular culture
The Birkin bag is a major plot point of the Sex and the City episode "Coulda, Woulda, Shoulda", in which Samantha is placed on a five-year waiting list for the bag. She is so desperate to obtain one that she falsely says the bag is for her celebrity client Lucy Liu. When Liu finds out she fires Samantha and keeps the bag for herself. The Birkin bag also made frequent appearances on the teen hit series Gossip Girl. Many of the bags, including a cognac ostrich Birkin 35, were from the personal collection of Kelly Rutherford, the actress who played Lily van der Woodsen.

In his 2008 memoir, Bringing Home the Birkin: My Life in Hot Pursuit of the World's Most Coveted Handbag, author Michael Tonello recounted his career selling used luxury goods on eBay.

In the Will & Grace episode "Last Ex to Brooklyn", Grace is given a Birkin by her husband's ex-girlfriend Diane, who works at Vogue. Will angrily says that he has been on a two-year waiting list for the bag.

In the Gilmore Girls episode "Welcome to the Dollhouse", Rory is given a Birkin by her boyfriend Logan. Emily says that around her birthday she had hinted to Richard about wanting one.

In How I Met Your Mother episode "The Mermaid Theory", Zoey is seen with a light brown Birkin bag as she enters the bar to meet and sit with Ted at MacLaren's pub.

Kim Kardashian made news in 2013 for a US$40,000 Birkin, given to her by husband Kanye West, on which the artist George Condo painted a group of nude figures. Another picture showed Khloe Kardashian's child nestled in US$108,000 worth of the bags, which drew some unfavorable comments about conspicuous consumption from her adherents. Additionally, Kim's daughter was publicized while carrying a US$17,000 Hermès bag.

In her 2015 memoir The Primates of Park Avenue, author Wednesday Martin recounts how Birkin bags signal social class status on the Upper East Side.

Former First Lady Melania Trump carried a Birkin bag during her summer 2018 trip to Scotland.

The Birkin features in the lyrics of numerous rap songs, including Jay-Z's "30-Something", ASAP Rocky and Schoolboy Q's "Electric Body", and the Migos track "Jane" which is a reference to Jane Birkin. Following the release of his and Future's track "Big Mood", Canadian rapper Drake explained the track's lyrics by stating that he has amassed a huge collection of Birkin bags as a gift to his future wife.

Rosmah Mansor, the second wife of Najib Razak, former prime minister of Malaysia, is claimed to have the largest Birkin collection in the world. In 2018, Malaysian police found a total of 272 Hermès bags, worth nearly US$13 million, after seizing the family's three apartments in Kuala Lumpur.

Other known large collections of Birkin bags include: Singapore socialite Jamie Chua, who reportedly owns more than 200 Hermès Birkin and Kelly bags, and celebrity fashion designer Victoria Beckham, who reportedly has more than 100 Birkin bags.

In 2021, NY-based designer MSCHF bought $122,500 of Birkin bags and used them to craft a new "Birkinstocks" sandal. Rapper Future was seen wearing a pair of the shoes in February 2021.

Comedian and rapper Zack Fox makes a reference to Birkin bags in his song "Marinate". Rapper Cardi B is also a vocal fan of the Birkin bag, and references them in her 2018 song "She Bad" and her 2021 hit "Up". She also frequently posts her large Birkin collection on social media sites like Instagram.

In The Good Fight, episode "The Gang Offends Everyone," Lucca buys herself a brand new, $20,000 Birkin bag and immediately suffers the consequences. For one, the conspicuousness of carrying it around raises eyebrows—Marissa, ooh-ing and aah-ing, quips "Everyone wants one. Like a yacht or a pony."—but then there is also the issue of whether she really has the money to pay for it.  The Birkin bag used on set was real.

See also
 Conspicuous consumption
 Economic materialism
 Kelly bag
 Social prestige

References

External links

 Hermès
 Birkin Bags

Bags (fashion)
Leather goods
Products introduced in 1984